This article lists important figures and events in Malayan public affairs during the year 1950, together with births and deaths of significant Malayans.

Incumbent political figures

Central level
 Governor of Malaya :
 Henry Gurney
 Chief Minister of Malaya  :
 Tunku Abdul Rahman Putra

State level
  Perlis :
 Raja of Perlis : Syed Harun Putra Jamalullail 
 Menteri Besar of Perlis : Raja Ahmad Raja Endut
  Johore :
 Sultan of Johor : Sultan Ibrahim Al-Masyhur
 Menteri Besar of Johore :
 Onn Jaafar (until 18 May)
 Vacant (from 18 May)
  Kedah :
 Sultan of Kedah : Sultan Badlishah
 Menteri Besar of Kedah : Mohamad Sheriff Osman
  Kelantan :
 Sultan of Kelantan : Sultan Ibrahim
 Menteri Besar of Kelantan : Nik Ahmad Kamil Nik Mahmud 
  Trengganu :
 Sultan of Trengganu : Sultan Ismail Nasiruddin Shah
 Menteri Besar of Trengganu : Raja Kamaruddin Idris
  Selangor :
 Sultan of Selangor : Sultan Sir Hishamuddin Alam Shah Al-Haj
 Menteri Besar of Selangor : Raja Uda Raja Muhammad
  Penang :
 Monarchs : King George VI
 Residents-Commissioner : Arthur Vincent Aston 
  Malacca :
 Monarchs : King George VI
 Residents-Commissioner :
  Negri Sembilan :
 Yang di-Pertuan Besar of Negri Sembilan : Tuanku Abdul Rahman ibni Almarhum Tuanku Muhammad 
 Menteri Besar Negri Sembilan :
 Abdul Malek Yusuf (until 15 August)
 Muhammad Salleh Sulaiman (from 15 August)
   Pahang :
 Sultan of Pahang : Sultan Abu Bakar
 Menteri Besar of Pahang : Mahmud Mat 
  Perak :
 British Adviser of Perak : James Innes Miller 
 Sultan of Perak : Sultan Yusuf Izzuddin Shah
 Menteri Besar of Perak : Abdul Wahab Toh Muda Abdul Aziz

Events
22 January – Penang ambush.
22 January - Labis incident.
4–11 February - Malaya competed for the first time in the 1950 British Empire Games in Auckland, New Zealand. The Malaya team had most success in weightlifting, with two gold medals, one silver and one bronze.
23 February – The Bukit Kepong Incident took place in Bukit Kepong, Muar, Johor.
25 March – The Battle of Semur River.
March – Lt. Gen. Harold Rawdon Briggs was appointed Director of Operations in Malaya.
Unknown date – The Evidence Act 1950 was enacted.

Births 
 24 January – Abdul Aziz Mohd Yusof – Director of Election Commission and Secretary of Ministry of Home Affair
 11 February – Ainon Mohd – Writer
 27 February – Azean Irdawaty – Actress and singer (died 2013)
 5 March – Jamil bin Osman – Rector and CEO Kolej Universiti Insaniah, Kedah
 10 April – Rahim Thamby Chik – Politician and former Chief Minister of Malacca
 18 April – Adnan Yaakob – Menteri Besar of Pahang
 4 August – Abang Johari Tun Openg – Politician and Chief Minister of Sarawak
 18 August – Abu Bakar Chik – Politician
 25 September – Mustapa Mohamed – Politician
 27 September – Raja Petra Kamaruddin – Blogger
 16 December – Yaakub bin Md Amin – Former Chairman Committee of State Education, Science & Technology and Human Resource Malacca
 Unknown date – Ahmad Tarmimi Siregar – Actor
 Unknown date – Habsah Hassan – Lyrics writer
 Unknown date – Wan Hanafi Su – Actor

Deaths

See also 
 1950
 1949 in Malaya | 1951 in Malaya
 History of Malaysia

References 

 
Years of the 20th century in Malaysia
Malaya
Malaya
Malaya